Queuluacocha (Quechua qillwa, qiwlla, qiwiña gull, qucha lake, "gull lake") is a  mountain in the Andes of Peru at a small lake of that name. It is located in the Huánuco Region, Huánuco Province, Chaulán District. It is southwest of Algay.

References

Mountains of Peru
Mountains of Huánuco Region
Lakes of Peru
Lakes of Huánuco Region